Tania Mallet (19 May 1941 – 30 March 2019) was an English actress and model, best known for playing Tilly Masterson in the James Bond film Goldfinger (1964).

Early life and ancestry
Mallet was born on 19 May 1941 in Blackpool, the daughter of Russian noblewoman and former chorus girl Olga Mironoff and English millionaire car salesman Henry Mallet. Her maternal grandfather Pyotr, who owned a family estate near Gzhatsk (now Gagarin, Smolensk Oblast), was a member of the Russian aristocracy. His mother was Countess Lydia Andreevna Kamenskaya, aristocrat and a descendant of Count Mikhail Fedotovich Kamensky, a prominent Russian general in the Napoleonic Wars. Tania Mallett signed her name with the double "-tt" when giving autographs and her modelling card as a Lucie Clayton model in 1968 was as "Tania Mallett". Her half-brothers Paul and Peter both spell their names as 'Mallett'. She was a cousin of actress Helen Mirren; her mother and Mirren's father were siblings. Her maternal grandfather, Pyotr Mironov, was an aristocratic colonel in the Imperial Russian army, who was serving as a diplomat in London as the Russian Revolution was unfolding and decided to stay in the UK. Mallet was educated in both England and France. Her parents divorced and her mother later married conman George Dawson, who served three years in prison for committing fraud.

Career

Mallet worked as a model before becoming an actress. She appeared twice on the cover of Vogue in 1961, and in Michael Winner's short film Girls Girls Girls released the same year.

Mallet reportedly auditioned for the part of Tatiana Romanova in From Russia with Love (1963); although half-Russian, she was unsuccessful due to her English accent. According to Mallet, she was given the part of "Bond girl" Tilly Masterson 
in Goldfinger (1964) when someone sent a photo of her wearing a bikini to producer Albert Broccoli. 
Despite the film's commercial and critical success, Goldfinger was Mallet's only major film role. Cast as the revenge-seeking sister of the murdered Jill Masterson (Shirley Eaton), her own character was killed by the steel-rimmed hat of Goldfinger's henchman Oddjob. Her only other acting role was in 1976, an uncredited appearance as Sara in the New Avengers episode "The Midas Touch".

Mallet cited two reasons for returning to modelling and turning down all further film offers. She did not like the restrictions imposed on her personal freedom when she was under contract during the filming of Goldfinger, including being unable to travel abroad or ride horses. She also said the money was "dreadful". She was initially offered £50 a week and managed to increase her fee to £150 a week after tough negotiations, but was still dismayed as she had been earning this kind of money daily as a model.

Personal life
Mallet married Simon Radcliffe in 1976, and became stepmother to his children. They remained married until his death in 2016. It was Mallet's second marriage.

Mallet's cousin Helen Mirren described Mallet in her autobiography as "impossibly beautiful and kind" and "a loyal and generous person" who used her earnings from modelling to pay for her brother's education and financially support her mother.

Death
Mallet died on 30 March 2019, aged 77.

Filmography

References

External links
 

1941 births
2019 deaths
English film actresses
English people of Russian descent
Place of death missing
English female models
Actresses from Lancashire
People from Blackpool
20th-century English actresses